Croptilon divaricatum, called the slender scratchdaisy, is a North American species of flowering plants in the tribe Astereae within the family Asteraceae. It is native to the southeastern and south-central United States, in the states of Texas, Oklahoma, Arkansas, Louisiana, Mississippi, Alabama, Florida, Georgia, Virginia, and the Carolinas.

Croptilon divaricatum is an annual or perennial herb sometimes reaching a height of 150 cm (5 feet) and forming a large taproot. Each plant produces one or more yellow flower heads, each with up to 30 ray florets and as many as 100 disc florets.

References

Flora of the United States
Plants described in 1818
Astereae